Steven Jerome Pienaar (born 17 March 1982) is a South African former professional footballer and current assistant coach of the U18 team of the Ajax Youth Academy.

He was a captain of the South African national team. He primarily played as a winger, but also played as an attacking midfielder. Pienaar played at club level in South Africa, the Netherlands, Germany, and England for Ajax Cape Town, Ajax, Borussia Dortmund, Everton, Tottenham Hotspur, Sunderland and Bidvest Wits. Pienaar is currently serving as an international ambassador at former club Everton.

Club career

Ajax Cape Town
Pienaar was born in Johannesburg. He was brought to the attention of Ajax CT whilst playing for the School of Excellence and was asked to join their youth academy.

Pienaar said, "I was very fortunate to go to the School of Excellence 2000, to be able to polish the technique and the talent that God gave me and to learn how to use it in the way that God had wanted me to." "I was fortunate to work with the Dutch coach Leo van Veen, who helped me at Ajax Cape Town... He appreciated the way I played but at the same time he changed my mentality. He taught me how to prepare for games, not just playing to please the crowd but also how to play for the team."

At Ajax Cape Town, he won the Rothman's Cup after beating Orlando Pirates 4–1 in the final on 13 December 2000, his final game for the club.

Ajax
At the age of 18, Pienaar was brought over to the Netherlands in January 2001 but did not make his Eredivisie debut until 24 February 2002, a 1–0 victory over NAC Breda. He became a pivotal member of the Ajax team that won the Dutch League in 2002 and 2004, shining as one of Ajax's best players alongside Zlatan Ibrahimović, Maxwell, Cristian Chivu, Mido, Nigel de Jong, Rafael van der Vaart, and Wesley Sneijder, as well as future Everton teammates John Heitinga and Andy van der Meyde.

Borussia Dortmund
In January 2006, German club Borussia Dortmund of the Bundesliga signed Pienaar on a three-year contract from Ajax. Seen as a replacement for the Arsenal-bound Tomáš Rosický, Pienaar's first year with Dortmund saw him receive the number 10 shirt vacated by the Czech playmaker. Pienaar, however, struggled at Dortmund and never felt truly accepted by the other players at the club.

Everton
Pienaar joined Everton on loan for the 2007–08 and later signed a three-year contract from Dortmund for a pre-agreed fee of £2 million after payment of an initial loan fee of £350,000 in April 2008. Pienaar made his debut for Everton in a 2–1 home victory over Wigan Athletic on 11 August 2007, replacing Leon Osman in the 73rd minute as a substitute. Pienaar scored his first Everton goal in a 2–0 home victory over Middlesbrough on 30 September. He produced some stand out performances and this led to many clubs showing interest in him.

Despite missing 11 games through injury, Pienaar was named Everton's Player of the Season for 2009–10.

Tottenham Hotspur
In January 2011, both Chelsea and Tottenham Hotspur had bids accepted to buy Pienaar from Everton before the South African joined Spurs for a fee of £3 million on a four-year contract. He made his Tottenham debut in a 1–1 draw away to Newcastle United. In August 2011, Pienaar suffered a groin injury, which ruled him out for six weeks. Pienaar scored his first goal for Spurs in a 4–0 victory over Irish side Shamrock Rovers in the Europa League on 15 December.

Pienaar's spell at Tottenham was characterised by persistent injuries and not much impact in games, which resulted him rarely featuring in the team.

Return to Everton
Late on transfer deadline day in January 2012, Pienaar completed a return to Everton on a six-month loan deal. He made his second debut for the club in a 1–1 draw away to Wigan Athletic, and scored his first goal of his loan spell with opener in a 2–0 win over Chelsea a week later. Pienaar finished the season by scoring against Newcastle United, stating in a post-match interview his wish to rejoin Everton. Despite only playing in 14 games, and being cup-tied from the FA Cup, Pienaar finished his spell with six assists, the most of anyone at Everton for the season. He also scored four goals, which was at the time his joint-best tally in the league for Everton.

A permanent transfer was agreed in July 2012, with Everton paying Tottenham a fee of £4.5 million. On 25 August 2012, he scored his first goal since signing permanently, opening the scoring in a 1–3 away win against Aston Villa. On 9 December, Pienaar scored a powerful header against former club Tottenham, Everton's 1,000th goal in the Premier League, as they came from a goal down to win 2–1 at Goodison. Pienaar was sent off for two bookable offences twice during the season, against Queens Park Rangers and Manchester City. Everton drew 1–1 against QPR and beat City 2–0. Pienaar finished the season with seven goals, the joint-most he has ever scored in a season with Everton. In October 2013, Pienaar returned from a hamstring injury suffered two months earlier as he came on as a substitute against Hull City and scored the winning goal just ten seconds later. Despite Everton finishing the 2013–14 season fifth with a club record of 72 Premier League points, Pienaar struggled with injuries for large parts of it and only scored one goal and made two assists in the matches he did feature in.

Pienaar made relatively few appearances over the next two seasons and, at the end of 2015–16, he was released by Everton when his contract expired.

Late career
On 19 August 2016, Pienaar signed a one-year contract with Sunderland, reuniting with former manager David Moyes. He made 17 appearances and his contract was not renewed at the end of the season. He returned to South Africa, signing a one-year deal with Bidvest Wits in July 2017, but was released six months later. He retired from professional football in March 2018.

International career
A former under-17 international, Pienaar made his international debut for South Africa in a 2–0 win against Turkey in 2002. He earned 61 caps and scored three goals over the course of his international career. Pienaar participated at the 2002 and 2010 World Cups, the latter on home soil.

On 2 October 2012, Pienaar announced his retirement from international duties.

Coaching career
After retiring, Pienaar began coaching at Dutch amateur club SV Robinhood under head coach Nana Tutu, who formerly worked for AFC Ajax to help African players in the club. In September 2019, he completed his UEFA A Licence and in December 2019, Pienaar returned to AFC Ajax as a Trainee Coach.

Personal life
Pienaar is from the mixed-race South African community known as Coloureds. He is commonly referred to by his nickname "Schillo" in South Africa, a childhood nickname given to him by friends after the exploits of Totò Schillaci during the 1990 World Cup.

Controversy
Pienaar's ex-girlfriend Danielle Steeneveld attempted to sue Pienaar for ZAR10.8million in August 2009 for not marrying her. 
Pienaar was charged with drunk-driving and failure to comply with a traffic sign in central Liverpool in February 2010. He was subsequently found guilty of driving whilst under the influence of alcohol and was banned from driving for 12 months.

In April 2012, a warrant was issued for Pienaar's arrest after he failed to appear before Chelmsford Magistrate's court on two counts of speeding.

Advertising
In the run up to the 2010 World Cup in South Africa, Pienaar was involved in a high-profile Adidas sportswear advertising campaign.

Career statistics

Club

Honours
Ajax
Eredivisie: 2001–02, 2003–04
KNVB Cup: 2001–02

Everton
 FA Cup runner-up: 2008–09

Individual
 Ajax CT Young Player of the Season: 2000
 Ajax Talent of the Year (Marco van Basten Award): 2002–03
 UEFA Champions League top assist provider: 2005–06
 SAFA Player of the Year: 2009
 Everton Player of the Season: 2009–10

See also

References

External links

 
 Steven Pienaar profile at the Everton website
 
 
 
 Goal.com profile
 

1982 births
Living people
Soccer players from Johannesburg
South African soccer players
Association football midfielders
Cape Town Spurs F.C. players
AFC Ajax players
Borussia Dortmund players
Everton F.C. players
Tottenham Hotspur F.C. players
Eredivisie players
Sunderland A.F.C. players
Bidvest Wits F.C. players
Bundesliga players
Premier League players
Cape Coloureds
South Africa international soccer players
2002 FIFA World Cup players
2009 FIFA Confederations Cup players
2008 Africa Cup of Nations players
South African expatriate soccer players
South African expatriate sportspeople in the Netherlands
Expatriate footballers in the Netherlands
South African expatriate sportspeople in Germany
Expatriate footballers in Germany
South African expatriate sportspeople in England
Expatriate footballers in England
2010 FIFA World Cup players
FA Cup Final players